The Patriotic Union was a political party in Panama. It was formed on 5 October 2006 when the National Liberal Party (Partido Nacional Liberal) and the Solidarity Party (Partido Solidaridad) merged.

The party's president was Guillermo Ford. After the party did not reach the minimum votes, it was merged with the Democratic Change Party on 27 March 2011.

See also
Liberalism worldwide
List of liberal parties
Liberalism in Panama

Defunct political parties in Panama
Liberal parties in Panama